G.M.Dimitrov Metro Station is a station on the Sofia Metro in Bulgaria.  It opened on 8 May 2009.

Interchange with other public transport
 City Bus service: 88, 280, 294, 413
 Suburban Bus service: 67, 69, 70, 123

Location

Gallery

References

External links

 Sofia Metropolitan
 Unofficial site

Sofia Metro stations
Railway stations opened in 2009
2009 establishments in Bulgaria